Virola multinervia is a species of tree in the family Myristicaceae.  It is found in Colombia, Peru, Ecuador, Venezuela and Brazil (Amazonas, Pará).  It grows to a height of about 35m.  The fruit is ellipsoidal to ovoidal, 26–40 mm long, 19–32 mm in diameter, and is found in groups of 1 to 7.

See also
Psychedelic plants

References

multinervia
Medicinal plants
Trees of Brazil
Trees of Colombia
Trees of Ecuador
Trees of Peru
Trees of Venezuela